Mollie Joy Robbins (born 4 October 1998) is an English cricketer who currently plays for Gloucestershire and Western Storm. She plays as a right-arm medium bowler.

Early and personal life
Robbins was born on 4 October 1998 in Bristol. In 2022, she was appointed Head Coach of Thornbury Cricket Club's women's team.

Domestic career
Robbins made her county debut in 2013, for Gloucestershire against Derbyshire. The following season, 2014, she was Gloucestershire's joint-leading wicket-taker in the County Championship, with 6 wickets at an average of 14.83. Robbins soon became a regular in Gloucestershire's side, with strong seasons coming in the 2016 and 2017 Championships, where she took 7 wickets in each season, including a best bowling of 4/2 in a 2017 match against Wiltshire. In the 2019 Women's County Championship, Robbins took 14 wickets, the second-highest tally across the whole competition, including her maiden five-wicket haul, 5/19 against Dorset. She also achieved her T20 high score that season, scoring 47 from 40 balls against Wiltshire. In 2021, she helped her side to winning the South West Group of the Twenty20 Cup, taking 2 wickets and scoring 41 runs. She took four wickets at an average of 30.00 in the 2022 Women's Twenty20 Cup.

In 2021, Robbins was selected in the Western Storm squad for their upcoming season. She played four matches for the side in the Rachael Heyhoe Flint Trophy, without taking a wicket. She was again in the Western Storm squad in 2022, but did not play a match.

References

External links

1998 births
Living people
Cricketers from Bristol
Gloucestershire women cricketers
Western Storm cricketers